Patricia Alejandra Bermúdez (born 5 February 1987 in Santiago del Estero) is an Argentine freestyle wrestler. She competed in the freestyle 48 kg event at the 2012 Summer Olympics and was eliminated in the qualifications by Iwona Matkowska. She won the bronze medal at the 2011 Pan American Games.

In 2020, she competed in the Pan American Olympic Qualification Tournament, held in Ottawa, Canada, without qualifying for the 2020 Summer Olympics in Tokyo, Japan. In 2021, she won one of the bronze medals in the women's 50 kg event at the 2021 Pan American Wrestling Championships held in Guatemala City, Guatemala. In October 2021, she was eliminated in her first match in the women's 50 kg event at the World Wrestling Championships held in Oslo, Norway.

She won one of the bronze medals in her event at the 2022 Pan American Wrestling Championships held in Acapulco, Mexico. She also won one of the bronze medals in her event at the 2022 Tunis Ranking Series event held in Tunis, Tunisia. She competed in the 50kg event at the 2022 World Wrestling Championships held in Belgrade, Serbia.

References

External links

 

1987 births
Living people
Argentine female sport wrestlers
Pan American Games bronze medalists for Argentina
Olympic wrestlers of Argentina
Wrestlers at the 2012 Summer Olympics
Wrestlers at the 2016 Summer Olympics
People from Santiago del Estero
Pan American Games medalists in wrestling
Wrestlers at the 2011 Pan American Games
South American Games silver medalists for Argentina
South American Games medalists in wrestling
Competitors at the 2014 South American Games
Medalists at the 2011 Pan American Games
Pan American Wrestling Championships medalists
Sportspeople from Santiago del Estero Province
21st-century Argentine women